Gårdskär is a locality situated in Älvkarleby Municipality, Uppsala County, Sweden with 352 inhabitants in 2010.

References 

Populated places in Uppsala County
Populated places in Älvkarleby Municipality